The Roman Catholic Diocese of Viviers is a diocese of the Latin Church of the Roman Catholic Church in France. Erected in the 4th century, the diocese was restored in the Concordat of 1822, and comprises the department of Ardèche, in the Region of Rhône-Alpes. Currently the diocese is a suffragan of the Archdiocese of Lyon. Its current bishop is Jean-Louis Marie Balsa, appointed in 2015.

History
Saint Andéol, disciple of Saint Polycarp, evangelized the Vivarais under Emperor Septimius Severus and was martyred in 208.

The "Old Charter", drawn up in 950 by Bishop Thomas, the most complete document concerning the primitive Church of Viviers, mentions five bishops who lived at Alba Augusta (modern Alba-la-Romaine): Januarius, Saint Septimus, Saint Maspicianus, Saint Melanius and Saint Avolus. The last was a victim of the invasion of the barbarian Chrocus (the exact date of which is unknown).

In consequence of the ravages suffered by Alba Augusta, the new bishop, Saint Auxonius, transferred the see to Viviers about 430. Promotus was probably the first Bishop of Viviers; the document also mentions later several canonized bishops: Saints Lucian and Valerius (fifth and sixth centuries); Saint Venantius, disciple of Saint Avitus, who was present at the councils held in 517 and 535; Saint Melanius II (sixth century); saints Eucherius, Firminus, Aulus, Eumachius, and Longinus (seventh century); St. Arcontius, martyr (date unknown, perhaps later than the ninth century.

It seems that the Diocese of Viviers was disputed for a long time by the metropolitan Sees of Vienne and Arles. From the eleventh century its dependence on Vienne was not contested. John II, cardinal and Bishop of Viviers (1073–1095), had the abbatial church of Cruas consecrated by Urban II and accompanied him to the Council of Clermont.

Afterwards, it is said that Conrad III gave Lower Vivaraisas to Bishop William (1147) as an independent suzerainty. In the thirteenth century, under the reign of St. Louis of France, the Bishop of Viviers was obliged to recognize the jurisdiction of the Seneschal of Beucaire. By the treaty of 10 July 1305 Philip IV of France obliged the bishops of Viviers to admit the suzerainty of the kings of France over all their temporal domain.

Viviers was often troubled by religious conflicts: the Albigensian Crusade in the thirteenth century; the revolt of the Calvinists against Louis XIII (1627–1629), which ended in the capture of Privas by the royal army; the Dragonnades under Louis XIV after the revocation of the Edict of Nantes; the war of the Camisards.

It was suppressed by the Concordat of 1802, and united to the See of Mende. Re-established in 1822, the diocese then included almost all the ancient Diocese of Viviers and some part of the ancient Diocese of Valence, Vienne, Le Puy and Uzès (see Nîmes) and was suffragan of the Archdiocese of Avignon.

Bishops

To 1000

 Januarius
 Septimius
 Maspicianus
 Melanius I
 c. 407–c. 411: Avolus
 c. 411–c. 431: Auxonius
 c. 452–c. 463: Eulalius
 c. 486–c. 500: Lucianus
 c. 507: Valerius
 c. 517–c. 537: Venantius
 Rusticus
(attested 549) Melanius II
 Eucherius
 Firminus
 Aulus
 Eumachius
 c. 673: Longinus.
 Joannes I.
 Ardulfus
 c. 740: Arcontius
 Eribaldus
 c. 815: Thomas I.
 c. 833: Teugrinus
 c. 850: Celse
 c. 851: Bernoin
 c. 875: Etherius (Ætherius)
 c. 892: Rostaing I
 c. 908: Richard
 c. 950: Thomas II
 c. 965–c. 970: Rostaing II
 c. 974: Arman I
 c. 993: Pierre

From 1000 to 1300

 1014–1041: Arman II.
 1042–1070: Gérard
 1073–1095: Giovanni di Toscanella.
 1096–1119: Leodegarius
 1119–1124: Hatto (Atton)
 1125–1131: Pierre I
 1133–1146: Josserand de Montaigu
 1147–1155: Guillaume I
 1157–1170: Raymond d'Uzès
 1171–1173: Robert de La Tour du Pin
 1174–1205: Nicolas
 1205–1220: Bruno (Burnon)
 1220–1222: Guillaume II.
 1222–1242: Bermond d'Anduze
 1244–1254: Arnaud de Vogüé
 1255–1263: Aimon de Genève
 1263–1291: Hugues de La Tour du Pin
 1292–1296: Guillaume de Falguières
 1297–1306: Aldebert de Peyre

From 1300 to 1500

 1306–1318: Louis de Poitiers
 1319–1322: Guillaume de Flavacourt
 1322–1325: Pierre de Mortemart
 1325–1326: Pierre de Moussy
 1326–1330: Aymar de La Voulte
 1331–1336: Henri de Thoire-Villars
 1336–1365: Aymar de La Voulte (again)
 1365–1373: Bertrand de Châteauneuf
 1373–1375: Pierre de Sarcenas
 1376–1383: Bernard d'Aigrefeuille
 1383–1385: Jean Allarmet de Brogny (Avignon Obedience)
 1385–1387: Olivier de Poitiers (Avignon Obedience).
 1387–1388: Pietro Pileo di Prata (Avignon Obedience)
 1389–1406: Guillaume de Poitiers (Avignon Obedience)
 1406–1442: Jean de Linières (Avignon Obedience)
 1442–1454: Guillaume-Olivier de Poitiers
 1454–1477: Hélie de Pompadour
 1477–1478: Giuliano della Rovere
 1478–1497: Jean de Montchenu
 1498–1542: Claude de Tournon

From 1500 to 1805

 1542–1550: Charles de Tournon
 1550–1554: Simon de Maillé-Brézé
 1554 : Cardinal Alessandro Farnese
 1554–1564: Jacques-Marie Sala
 1564–1571: Eucher de Saint-Vital
 1571–1572: Pierre V. d'Urre
 1575–1621: Jean V. de L'Hôtel
 1621–1690: Louis-François de la Baume de Suze
 1692–1713: Antoine de La Garde de Chambonas
 1713–1723: Martin de Ratabon
 [1723: Etienne-Joseph I. de La Fare-Monclar]
 1723–1748: François-Renaud de Villeneuve
 1748–1778: Joseph-Robin Morel de Mons
 1778–1802: Charles de La Font de Savine

From 1802
 Vacancy to 1823
 1823–1825: André Molin
 1825–1841: Abbon-Pierre-François Bonnel de la Brageresse
 1841–1857: Joseph Hippolyte Guibert
 1857–1876: Louis Delcusy
 1876–1923: Joseph-Michel-Frédéric Bonnet
 1923–1930: Etienne-Joseph Hurault
 1931–1937: Pierre-Marie Durieux
 1937–1965: Alfred Couderc
 1965–1992: Jean VI. Hermil
 1992–1998: Jean-Marie Louis Bonfils
 1999–2015: François Marie Joseph Pascal Louis Blondel
 2015–present: Jean-Louis Marie Balsa

See also
 Viviers Cathedral

References

Books

Reference works
 (Use with caution; obsolete)
  (in Latin) 
 (in Latin)

Studies

External links
  Centre national des Archives de l'Église de France, L’Épiscopat francais depuis 1919, retrieved: 2016-12-24.

Viviers
Viviers
4th-century establishments in Roman Gaul
1822 establishments in France